Nick Schultz may refer to:
 Nick Schultz (ice hockey)
 Nick Schultz (cyclist)
 Nick Schultz (Blue Heelers)